Bardney Abbey in Lincolnshire, England, was a Benedictine monastery founded in 697 by King Æthelred of Mercia, who was to become the first abbot. The monastery was supposedly destroyed during a Danish raid in 869. In 1087, the site was refounded as a priory, by Gilbert de Gant, Earl of Lincoln, and it regained status as an abbey in 1115.

In 1537, six of the Bardney Abbey monks were executed for their role in the Lincolnshire Rising. In 1538, the Abbey was disbanded and its property seized during the Dissolution of the Monasteries campaign started by Henry VIII.  The property was then granted to Sir Robert Tirwhit.

Tirwhit retained the abbot's lodging as a house and converted the cloister into a garden.  In later years, the lodging and garden became ruins along with the remainder of the former abbey.

Excavations from 1909 through 1914 revealed the layout of Bardney Abbey. This can still be seen, though nothing remains to any height. Further excavations and conservation took place in 2009 and 2011. Some grave slabs and carved stones are preserved in Bardney parish church, which is dedicated to St Lawrence.  It is now owned by the charity the Jews' Court and Bardney Abbey Trust.

Relics of St Oswald

Burials
Oswald of Northumbria
Æthelred of Mercia
Osthryth
Gilbert de Gant
Alice de Montfort-sur-Risle, wife of Gilbert de Gant
Walter de Gant, father of Gilbert de Gant, Earl of Lincoln
Maud of Brittany (daughter of Stephen, Count of Tréguier), wife of Walter de Gaunt
Alice de Gant, d. c. 1181 (daughter of Walter de Gant), wife of Roger de Mowbray (Lord of Montbray)

Known abbots of Bardney
This list is taken from the Victoria County History, and Bowyer's History of the Mitred Parliamentary Abbies.

Original foundation:
St. Ethelred, ex-king of Mercia, and founder of the abbey, made abbot about 704, died 716
Kenewin, occurs 833

Benedictine foundation:
hi
Ralf, prior in 1087, about 1115
Ivo, occurs about 1133
John of Ghent, elected 1140, occurs 1147 and 1150
Walter, occurs 1155 to 1166
John, occurs 1167
Ralf of Stainfield, occurs 1180
Robert, occurs 1191
Ralf de Rand, occurs 1208, deposed 1214
Peter of Lenton, intruded 1214
Matthew, occurs 1218, died 1223
Adam de Ascwardby, elected 1225, occurs 1231 and 1240
William of Ripton
Walter of Benningworth, elected 1241, deposed 1243
William of Hatton, elected 1244
William of Torksey, elected 1258, died 1266
Peter of Barton, elected 1266, resigned 1280
Robert of Wainfleet, elected 1280, resigned 1318
Richard of Gainsborough, elected 1318, died 1342
Roger of Barrow, elected 1342, died 1355
Thomas of Stapleton, elected 1355, died 1379
Hugh of Braunston, elected 1379, resigned 1385
John of Haynton, elected 1385
John Woxbrigge, elected 1404, died 1413
Geoffrey Hemingsby, elected 1413, died 1435
John Wainfleet, elected 1435, died 1447
Gilbert Multon, elected 1447, resigned 1466
Richard Horncastle, elected 1466, resigned 1507
William Marton, last abbot, elected 1507

Further reading 

Brakespear H (1922) "Bardney Abbey" Archaeological Journal Vol. 79,1-92.

 Includes finds record and floor plan from 1909 excavation.

An organisation called The Association of friends of Bardney Abbey existed from 1975 to 1993, and published a number of monographs in the 1970s whose titles and authors are listed by a number of internet sources but the actual works are more elusive.
 describing the refoundation of the Abbey by Gilbert de Gant with monks from Charroux.

In popular culture
Bardney was referred to as Bearddan Igge (Bardney Abbey) in The Saxon Stories by Bernard Cornwell.

See also 
 Jews' Court, Lincoln 
 List of monastic houses in Lincolnshire

References 

Churches in Lincolnshire
Monasteries in Lincolnshire
Anglo-Saxon monastic houses
Benedictine monasteries in England
7th-century establishments in England
1538 disestablishments in England
Christian monasteries established in the 7th century
Burial sites of the Royal House of Northumbria
Burial sites of the House of Icel
Monasteries dissolved under the English Reformation
Churches completed in 697
7th-century church buildings in England